Sir John Hotham, 2nd Baronet (21 March 163229 March 1689) was an English politician who sat in the House of Commons  from 1660 to 1685 and in 1689.

Hotham was the son of Captain John Hotham. He inherited the baronetcy in 1645 after his father and grandfather the 1st Baronet were executed by the Parliamentarians during the English Civil War.

In 1660, Hotham was elected Member of Parliament for Beverley in the Convention Parliament. He was re-elected MP for Beverley  in 1661 for the Cavalier Parliament and sat until 1685. He was re-elected MP for Beverley in 1689 and sat until his death. He was Custos Rotulorum of the East Riding of Yorkshire from 1660 to 1680.

Death
Hotham died at the age of 57 and was buried at St Mary's Church, South Dalton where there is a large monument. He is represented in life, as a reclining knight in full armour, with his helmet and gauntlet beside him, and in death, as a skeleton. Supporting the four corners of the tomb are statues representing the cardinal virtues.

Family
Hotham married Elizabeth, daughter of Sapcote Beaumont, 2nd Viscount Beaumont of Swords. Their son, John, inherited the baronetcy briefly before the baronetcy passed to a cousin Charles.

References

1632 births
1689 deaths
Baronets in the Baronetage of England
English MPs 1660
English MPs 1661–1679
English MPs 1679
English MPs 1680–1681
English MPs 1681
English MPs 1689–1690
People from Dalton Holme